Daria Bannister (born 20 April 1999) is an Australian rules footballer with Essendon in the AFL Women's (AFLW). Bannister was drafted by the Western Bulldogs with their fourth selection and nineteenth overall in the 2017 AFL Women's draft. She made her debut in the twenty-six point win against  at VU Whitten Oval in the opening round of the 2018 season. She suffered a knee injury in the fourth quarter of that match, later revealed to be a ruptured anterior cruciate ligament. The resulting surgery would see and end to her AFLW season and carry an estimated 12 months of recovery. In May 2018, Bannister signed with expansion club, North Melbourne, to play with the club in the 2019 AFLW season. It was revealed she signed on with the club for two more seasons on 17 June 2021, tying her to the club until the end of 2023. In May 2022, she joined expansion club Essendon.

Statistics
 Statistics are correct to the end of round 1, 2018

|- style="background-color: #EAEAEA"
! scope="row" style="text-align:center" | 2018
|
| 20 || 1 || 0 || 0 || 4 || 1 || 5 || 3 || 2 || 0.0 || 0.0 || 4.0 || 1.0 || 5.0 || 3.0 || 2.0
|- class="sortbottom"
! colspan=3| Career
! 1
! 0
! 0
! 4
! 1
! 5
! 3
! 2
! 0.0
! 0.0
! 4.0
! 1.0
! 5.0
! 3.0
! 2.0
|}

References

External links 

1999 births
Living people
Western Bulldogs (AFLW) players
Australian rules footballers from Tasmania
North Melbourne Football Club (AFLW) players